Joseph Randolph Cockerill (January 2, 1818 – October 23, 1875) was a U.S. Representative from Ohio for one term from 1857 to 1859.

Early life
Joseph R. Cockerill was born in Loudoun County, Virginia, January 2, 1818. He attended the public schools. Cockerill moved to Scott Township, Adams County, Ohio, in 1837 and settled in Youngsville. He taught school. He became County surveyor in 1840. He studied law, was admitted to the bar in 1851 and began the practice of law in West Union, Ohio. He served as clerk of the court of common pleas. He served as member of the State house of representatives in 1853 and 1854. Cockerill was elected as a Democrat to the Thirty-fifth Congress (March 4, 1857 – March 4, 1859). He was a delegate to the Charleston Convention.

American Civil War service
Cockerill entered the Union Army during the American Civil War and served as colonel of the 70th Ohio Infantry, December 20, 1861. Except for the periods between August 21, 1863, and September 19, 1863, and January 28, 1864, and March 11, 1864, he exercised brigade command in the Army of the Tennessee from October 26, 1862, to April 13, 1864.  He resigned his commission on April 13, 1864.

On March 18, 1867, President Andrew Johnson nominated Cockerill for appointment to the grade of brevet brigadier general of volunteers to rank from March 13, 1865, and the United States Senate confirmed the appointment on March 28, 1867.

Later life
After the Civil War, Joseph Cockerill was again a member of the Ohio house of representatives, 1868-1871. He lost election for Ohio State Auditor in 1871.

Joseph R. Cockerill died in West Union, Ohio, October 23, 1875. He was interred in Old West Union Cemetery, West Union.

Notes

References
 Eicher, John H., and David J. Eicher, Civil War High Commands. Stanford: Stanford University Press, 2001. .
 

1818 births
1875 deaths
People from West Union, Ohio
People from Loudoun County, Virginia
Democratic Party members of the Ohio House of Representatives
Democratic Party members of the United States House of Representatives from Ohio
Union Army generals
People of Ohio in the American Civil War
Ohio lawyers
19th-century American politicians
19th-century American lawyers